Kʼinich Janaab Pakal II, also known as Upakal Kʼinich, (fl. c.742), was an ajaw of the Maya city of Palenque. He ruled c.742 and he was probably brother of Kʼinich Ahkal Moʼ Nahb III. There are only few details about his reign like Bodega no. 1144 and portraits on a stucco-covered pier from Temple 19, only date from his reign is from 742, when he installed lord into important office.

Notes

Sources 

Rulers of Palenque
8th-century monarchs in North America
Year of death unknown
8th century in the Maya civilization